is a Japanese swimmer. She competed in the women's 100 metre butterfly at the 1984 Summer Olympics.

References

External links
 

1963 births
Living people
Japanese female butterfly swimmers
Olympic swimmers of Japan
Swimmers at the 1984 Summer Olympics
Place of birth missing (living people)
Asian Games medalists in swimming
Asian Games gold medalists for Japan
Asian Games silver medalists for Japan
Swimmers at the 1982 Asian Games
Medalists at the 1982 Asian Games
20th-century Japanese women